
Year 297 BC was a year of the pre-Julian Roman calendar. At the time it was known as the Year of the Consulship of Rullianus and Mus (or, less frequently, year 457 Ab urbe condita). The denomination 297 BC for this year has been used since the early medieval period, when the Anno Domini calendar era became the prevalent method in Europe for naming years.

Events 
 By place 
 Roman Republic 
 Third Samnite War:
 The consul Publius Decius Mus intercepts and defeats a force of Apulians near Maleventum, who were intending to reinforce the main Samnite army.
 The consul Quintus Fabius Maximus Rullianus defeats an attempted ambush by the Samnite army in the Battle of Tifernum, killing 3400, capturing 830 and causing the army to flee. He then invades Samnium and storms the town of Cimetra.

 Bithynia 
 Zipoetes I assumes the title of basileus (king) in Bithynia.

 Greece 
 Following Cassander's death from illness, Philip IV, Cassander's eldest son, succeeds his father as King of Macedon, but soon after coming to the throne suffers from a wasting disease and dies. Antipater, the next son, rules jointly with his brother Alexander V.
 Demetrius Poliorcetes returns to Greece with the aim of becoming master of Macedonia. While Demetrius is in Greece, Lysimachus seizes his possessions in Asia Minor.
 Ptolemy decides to support Pyrrhus of Epirus and restores him to his kingdom. At first Pyrrhus reigns with a kinsman, Neoptolemus II of Epirus (who is a son of Cleopatra of Macedonia and a nephew of Alexander the Great), but soon he has him assassinated.

 India 
 Chandragupta Maurya goes to Sravana Belagola near Mysore to live in the way of Jains.
 Bindusara his son ascends to the Pataliputra throne.

Births

Deaths 
 King Cassander of Macedon, one of the diadochoi ("successors"), the Macedonian generals who have fought over the empire of Alexander the Great after his death (b. c. 358 BC)
 Chandragupta Maurya, Emperor of the Maurya Empire in India, r. 322–297 BC (approximate date)

References